Cymothoe amenides is a butterfly in the family Nymphalidae. It is found in Cameroon and Gabon.

References

Butterflies described in 1874
Cymothoe (butterfly)
Butterflies of Africa
Taxa named by William Chapman Hewitson